This is a selective list of American experimental band Xiu Xiu's discography.

Albums

Studio albums

Live albums
 Life and Live (2005)

Compilation albums
 Fag Patrol (2003)
 Xiu Xiu for Life: The First 5 Years (2008) – Japanese best-of compilation
 Rare (2012) – Always companion compilation
 There Is No Right, There Is No Wrong (2014) – best-of compilation

EPs
 Chapel of the Chimes (2002)
 Tu Mi Piaci (2006)
 Grumpus Krampus (2022)

Singles
 "Fleshettes" CD-single (2004)
 The Special 12 Singles Series (2005)
 "Boy Soprano" / "San Pedro Glue Stick" picture disc 7-inch (2006)
 Jamie Stewart Pre-Xiu Xiu Picture disc 7-inch (2007)
 Untitled 12 month/12 disc subscription service – limited edition of 50 subscriptions (2009)
 "Razor Scooter" / "Sashay Away" digital single (2011)
 "Daphny" / "Only Girl (In the World)" 7-inch (2011)
 Graveface Records Charity 7-inch (2012)
 "Quagga" / "Thylacine" 7-inch (2012)
 "Fear of the Horizon" / "Turkish March" 7-inch art by Heidi Hahn (2017)
 "Between the Breaths" with Mitski (2018)
 "A Real Indication" digital single (2021)

Splits
 The Jim Yoshii Pile-Up & Xiu Xiu Split EP (Insound Tour Supports Series #26 (2003)
 This Song Is a Mess But So Am I & Xiu Xiu – 7-inch (2004)
 Bunkbed & Xiu Xiu – 7-inch (2004)
 Devendra Banhart & Xiu Xiu – 7-inch (2005)
 Kill Me Tomorrow & Xiu Xiu – 7-inch (2005)
 The Paper Chase & Xiu Xiu – 7-inch (2005)
 The Dead Science & Xiu Xiu – 7-inch (2005)
 WS-Burn & Xiu Xiu – 7-inch (2007)
 High Places & Xiu Xiu – 7-inch (2008)
 Parenthetical Girls (Morrissey/The Smiths covers, Upset the Rhythm (2009)
 Almost Xiu Xiu, Almost Deerhoof – 7-inch (2011)
 Chad VanGaalen & Xiu Xiu – The Green Corridor II 12-inch (2012)
 Dirty Beaches & Xiu Xiu – 7-inch (2012)
 Always "I Luv Abortion" / "Joeys Song" remixes by Deerhoof/Kid606 – 7-inch (2012)
 "Real Doll Factory" / "The Honour of the Season" split 7-inch with Lawrence English (2013)
 "Sharp Dressed Man" / "Gimme All Your Lovin'" split 7-inch with Fabrizio Palumbo as (r) (2017)

Collaborations
 ¡Ciaütistico! – collaboration with Larsen under the moniker XXL, for Xiu Xiu Larsen (2005)
 Creepshow – collaboration with Grouper under the artist name "Xiu Xiu vs. Grouper" (2006)
 Remixed & Covered – collaboration with artists including To Live and Shave in L.A. (Tom Smith (filker)), Her Space Holiday, Larsen, Oxbow, Sunset Rubdown, Marissa Nadler, Good For Cows, Kid606, XO Skeletons, Gold Chains, Devendra Banhart, Warbucks, Cherry Point, and Grouper) (2007)
 ¿Spicchiology? – Xiu Xiu and Larsen as XXL (2007)
 A Soundtrack for a Polaroid of Two Trees in Indiana – collaboration disc included with the Xiu Xiu: The Polaroid Project: The Book (2007)
 Desperate Living, Jamie Stewart collaboration with Horse the Band (2009)
 Blue Water White Death, Jamie Stewart collaboration with Jonathan Meiburg (2010)
 Hello Cruel World, track 1, "Napoleon", with Sole (formerly of Anticon) and The Skyrider Band (2011)
 Düde – Xiu Xiu and Larsen as XXL (2012)
 Sal Mineo, Jamie Stewart collaboration with Eugene Robinson of Oxbow (2013)
 Newstalgia, track 7, "8 Bit Memories" with Time (2013)
 Christmas Island, track 4, "Coffin Dance", Jamie Stewart collaboration with Andrew Jackson Jihad (2014)
 Metal collaboration with artist Danh Vo; 3 hour percussion piece played live at the Kitchen in New York City (2014)
 Extinction Meditation collaboration with Mantra; 4 movement percussion piece about environmental apocalypse – movements entitled 2050, 2071, 2092, 2113 (2015)
 Merzxiu – collaboration with Merzbow (2015)
 The Magic Flute, with Susanne Sachsee, Jonathan Berger and Vaginal Davis (2016)
 Puff O' Gigio – Xiu Xiu and Larsen as XXL (2019)
 Moira – Xiu Xiu and Black Leather Jesus (2021)

Xiu Mutha Fuckin Xiu subscription covers

References

Rock music group discographies
Discographies of American artists